Tadd Mullinix or Dabrye is an American musician from Ann Arbor, Michigan, United States, also known by the aliases James T. Cotton and SK-1. During his adolescent years, he grew up in Troy, MI. His Winking Makes a Face was the first album released by Ann Arbor's Ghostly International. Parting with the IDM sound of Winking..., the first Dabrye album was 2001's One/Three, whose take on instrumental hip-hop paralleled the work of artists such as Prefuse 73. His early influences are White Zombie and 7 Seconds. His first band in high school was Battery 3, a shoegazing takeoff of the band Spacemen 3.

Successive Dabrye projects included 2004's "Game Over" single, which featured MC work by Jay Dee and Phat Kat – the single was a precursor to the second Dabrye full-length Two/Three, which includes other notable underground figures like MF DOOM, Beans, Vast Aire, and Big Tone, and features art by France's WK Interact. Mullinix's work as Dabrye has been met with acclaim for its signature rhythmic sensibilities, which fuse the feel of live drumming with stylized electronic programming. Dabrye recently teamed up with then-roommate D'Marc Cantu to form the Techno/Acid house group 2 AM/FM. The track "Hyped-Up Plus Tax" from the One/Three album was used as a jingle for the Motorola RAZR V3 commercial.

Discography

As Dabrye

Albums
One/Three (2001)
Instrmntl (2002)
Additional Productions Vol.1 (2005)
Two/Three (2006)
Two/Three Instrumentals (2006)
Three/Three (2018)
Three/Three Instrumentals (2019)

Singles and EPs
"Game Over" single (2004)
Payback EP (2003)
Game Over EP (2004)
"Air" single (2006)
Get Dirty EP (2008)

As James T. Cotton

Albums
The Dancing Box (2004)
Like No One (2008)

EPs
Mind Your Manners (2001)
Buck! Ep (2003)
Press Your Body EP (2004)
Oochie Coo (2006)
On Time EP (2010)
Valley Road (We Are 1) (as JTC) (2013)

As Tadd Mullinix

Albums
Winking Makes a Face (2000)
Panes (2002)

With 2 AM/FM

EPs
Pt. 1 (2005)
Pt. 2 (2006)
Electronic Justice (2008)

References

Year of birth missing (living people)
Living people
Musicians from Ann Arbor, Michigan
American electronic musicians
Intelligent dance musicians
Hip hop record producers